Kentucky Route 455 (KY 455) is a  state highway in the U.S. state of Kentucky. The highway connects Glencoe and Warsaw, within Gallatin County.

Route description
KY 455 begins at an intersection with KY 16 on the east-central edge of Glencoe, within the southeastern part of Gallatin County. It travels to the west-northwest and enters Glencoe proper. It has a brief concurrency with US 127. When KY 455 splits off, it travels to the west-southwest. It curves to the northwest and crosses over Interstate 71 (I-71). The highway curves back to the west-southwest and intersects the eastern terminus of KY 465 (Boone Road). It travels to the north-northwest and curves to the northwest. The highway makes a gradual curve to the west-northwest and meets its eastern terminus, an intersection with KY 35 (Sparta Pike) on the southern edge of Warsaw.

Major intersections

See also

References

0455
Transportation in Gallatin County, Kentucky